Herman L. Rowe was an architect active in Lexington, Kentucky.  He was an immigrant from Germany.  A couple of his works are listed on the U.S. National Register of Historic Places (NRHP).

Works include:
Addition (1881) to Luigart & Harting Complex, Lexington, Kentucky, one of Rowe's earliest works in Lexington
Lexington Opera House (1886) designed by Oscar Cobb, for which Rowe was supervising architect during construction 
Fayette Safety Vault and Trust Company Building (1890), Lexington, Kentucky, NRHP-listed
Lexington Public Library (1905), a Carnegie library in Gratz Park, Lexington, Kentucky (now the Carnegie Center for Literacy and Learning)
Lexington Dry Goods Company Building (1907), 249-251 E. Main St., Lexington, Kentucky, NRHP-listed

For developer Luigart, Rowe also designed a planing mill complex on York Street and a number of other residences and buildings.

References

Architects from Lexington, Kentucky
Year of birth missing
Year of death missing